The cabinet led by Prime Minister Hassan Ali Mansur was inaugurated on 7 March 1964. It replaced the second government of Asadollah Alam. Mansur's cabinet was the first of party-governments in Iran. It was led by the Iran Novin Party and was approved by the Majlis on 8 March. It enjoyed nearly full confirmation at the Majlis, including the members of the opposition party, People's Party.

The cabinet's term ended in January 1965 when Hassan Ali Mansur was assassinated. Next cabinet was formed by Amir Abbas Hoveyda.

Cabinet members
The cabinet was consisted of the following twenty-two members. Some members served in the previous cabinet led by Asadollah Alam, and most of them were part of the Iran Novin Party. 

Four new ministries introduced through the establishment of the cabinet. One of them was the Ministry of Information which had replaced the Department of Publications and Broadcasting.

List of ministers
Source:

References

External links

1964 establishments in Iran
1965 disestablishments in Iran
Cabinets of Iran
Cabinets established in 1964
Cabinets disestablished in 1965